Melanocetus polyactis is a species of black seadevil, a type of anglerfish. It is endemic to the Gulf of Panama.

References

Melanocetidae
Deep sea fish
Fish described in 1925
Taxa named by Charles Tate Regan